Irma Michelle Martha Ninette Sol Schweikert de Castro most known as Michelle Sol (b. 20 December 1972) is a Salvadoran politician and the incumbent Minister of Housing of El Salvador.

Biography 

Michelle Sol was born on 20 December 1972 in Nuevo Cuscatlán, El Salvador.

Sol served as the mayor of Nuevo Cuscatlán from 1 May 2015 until 1 June 2019.

She was selected by President-elect Nayib Bukele to be his Minister of Housing. Sol was sworn in on 1 June 2019. She was one of the eight women who composed Nayib Bukele's cabinet of 16.

See also 

Cabinet of Nayib Bukele

References 

1972 births
Living people
Sol family
Housing ministers of El Salvador
People from La Libertad Department (El Salvador)
Nuevas Ideas politicians